Tapeswaram is a village  in East Godavari District of Andhra Pradesh.
The Uma Agastheswara Temple in Tapeswaram has a great importance and is believed to be constructed by Agasthya.

Cuisine 

Tapeswaram is best known for its sweet delicacy called Khaja.
The place is also famous for making the largest individual laddu. The place is also famous for various other sweets like Pootharekulu, Bobbatlu etc.

Transport 

 SH 102 that runs between Dwarapudi and Yanam passes through Tapeswaram. This road also connects Tapeswaram to Mandapeta.

The nearest railway station is at Dwarapudi which is 4.57 km away.

References

Villages in East Godavari district